Messina was a province in the autonomous island region of Sicily in Italy. Its capital was the city of Messina. It was replaced by the Metropolitan City of Messina.

Geography

Territory
There are 108 comuni (singular: comune) in the province , see Comuni of the Province of Messina.

The province included the Aeolian Islands, all part of the comune of Lipari (with the exception of Salina). The territory is largely mountainous, with the exception of alluvial plain at the mouths of the various rivers. The largest plain is that in the area between Milazzo and Barcellona Pozzo di Gotto, which, together with Messina, form a metropolitan area of some 500,000 inhabitants, one of the largest in southern Italy. Much of the population is concentrated in the coastal area, after the hill towns have been largely abandoned from the 19th century.

Rivers of the province include the Alcantara and the Pollina, which forms the border with the province of Palermo to the west.

Main communes
The main comunes by population are:

Religious Feasts and tradition

See also
Metropolitan City of Messina
Strait of Messina metropolitan area
Strait of Messina
History of Sicily
Aeolian Islands

References

External links
 Province website 
 Pictures, history, tourism, gastronomy, books, local products, local surnames, transportation in the province of Messina
 Travel itineraries in Messina, Taormina and Lipari Islands. Sicily TravelNet
 

 
Messina
1860 establishments in Italy
2015 disestablishments in Italy